Kim Hong-jae  (born October 10, 1954) is a Zainichi Korean conductor.

Early life
The first experience of music at his early age was an upright piano at his mother's maiden home. In 1967, he entered Amagasaki Korean Middle School and studied clarinet in school band. He also studied improved Korean folk instruments sent from North Korea. In 1969, School Band of Amagasaki Korean Middle School won a grand prize of 'Competition of Korean Students resident in Japan' under his direction.

In 1973, Kim entered Toho Gakuen School of Music as one of the first Korean nationals. He changed his clarinet major to conducting with Ken Takaseki and Naoto Otomo in 1975. Before his graduation in 1977, he attended the classes of, among others, Seiji Ozawa, Kazuyoshi Akiyama, Tadashi Mori and Shunsaku Tsutsumi. On Tsutsumi's recommendation, he was appointed as resident conductor of Tokyo City Philharmonic Orchestra when he studied in Toho. In 1977, he conducted Toho Orchestra with Seiji Ozawa on podium at Toho Gakuen's graduation concert.

Début, competition, and television concerts
After graduation, Kim was début officially with Tokyo City Philharmonic Orchestra on March 22, 1978 at Shibuya Public Hall, Tokyo. This concert, titled 'Special Concert of (North) Korean Orchestral Works,' got a sensational response-not only the first conductor of Korean nationality but of any work premièred in Japan.

Following this year, he participated in Tokyo International Conductors' Competition and was awarded the second prize with a special prize named after Hideo Saito. In the same year, he was invited by North Korea to conduct the State Symphony Orchestra of DPRK. In 1980, he conducted the concerts of prizewinners from Hokkaidō to Kyūshū.

Kim was appointed as the conductor of television program titled 'Here comes the orchestra' of Tokyo Broadcasting System(TBS) with Kazushi Ono and Deryck Inoue in 1980. Following this year, he conducted other television program titled 'My Concert' of Nippon Television(NTV). During these two years, he conducted numerous works from Bach to Shostakovich and accompanied many well-known soloists including Hiroko Nakamura, Mitsuko Uchida, Toshia Eto, Ko Iwasaki, Jean-Yves Thibaudet and Mikhail Pletnev with two regular orchestras-New Japan Philharmonic and Yomiuri Nippon Symphony Orchestra-and other cities' orchestras.

In 1981, Kim became a principal guest conductor of Tokyo City Philharmonic Orchestra. His other important positions were principal guest conductor of Nagoya Philharmonic Orchestra since 1985 and principal guest conductor of Kyoto Symphony Orchestra since 1987. He toured with Kyoto Symphony Orchestra in Pyongyang and Wonsan-first appearance of Japan's orchestra in North Korea-in 1987. He also appeared in Beijing with China Broadcasting Symphony Orchestra (now China Philharmonic Orchestra) in 1988.

Meetings with Isang Yun
Kim met the composer Isang Yun in 1986 and became an admirer of his music. He conducted Yun's first work Exemplum, in memoriam Kwangju on stage of '1st Hankyore Concert' in April 1989. He resigned three orchestras' positions and went to Germany in September. He studied Yun's works with the composer himself.

In 1990, he participated in 'Pan-Nation Unification Concert' held in Pyongyang and conducted Yun's Fanfare und Memorial in presence of the composer. And in 1992, Kim appeared on '75th Birthday Celebration Festival of Isang Yun' held in Tokyo and conducted Yun's Third Symphony''' premiered in Japan. Kim conducted more than pieces of Yun's works premiered in Japan, and was highly praised by the composer.

Crossover, Hankyoreh Concert, and other appearances
Kim's activities were not only formal classical concerts but crossover and concerts of Korean residents in Japan including Hankyoreh Concert (1989–1993). He introduced many North and South Korean songs and orchestral works, including those produced by his maternal uncle Cheol-Woo Lee. The 8th Hankyore Concert held in Carnegie Hall of New York City in September 1992, which was also Kim's début concert in the US.

He also met Joe Hisaishi, a well-known composer of Hayao Miyazaki and Takeshi Kitano's film music, with whom he appeared in many concerts together since 1991. Kim also conducted crossover concerts with Jazz musicians including Aiko Takahashi and Terumasa Hino. And he conducted many concert bands in Japan, including Tokyo Kosei Wind Orchestra and Osaka Municipal Symphonic Band, of which he was a principal conductor from 1991 to 1994. In 1998, he conducted opening ceremony of 7th Winter Paralympic Games held in Nagano (produced by Hisaishi.) Following this appearance, he received music prize named after Akeo Watanabe and became the only one that won two grand prizes for Japanese conductor at that time.

First appearance in South Korea
Kim and South Korean violinist Jeong Chan-Woo held a concert named 'Unity Concert' in June 2000. This concert was previously planned in 1985, but South Korean Ministry of Foreign Affairs did not approve of Jeong's departure to Japan due to his North Korean nationality. Thus this concert was a famous event not only to Korean residents in Japan but also in South Korea. In October 2000, he visited South Korea for the first time for ASEM Music Festival held in Seoul where he conducted Isang Yun's Muak'' and Asian premiere of Ferruccio Busoni's Piano Concerto played by the well-known pianist Baek Geon-Woo (Kun-Woo Paik) and KBS Symphony Orchestra.

At that time Kim still held North Korean nationality. He switched to South Korean nationality in August 2005.

By this time, Kim conducted nearly all orchestras of Japan except NHK Symphony Orchestra. He conducts not only professional but orchestras of university, citizens and other amateur orchestras and concert bands. And he appeared several concerts of KBS Symphony Orchestra, Korean Symphony Orchestra and National Orchestra of Korea in South Korea.

Since November 2007, Kim was appointed to his very first position in South Korea as a principal conductor of the Ulsan Symphony Orchestra.

References

Bibliography
 "Hong-Jae Kim, I Conducts Fate (김홍재, 나는 운명을 지휘한다)" by Hong-Jae Kim (dictate) & Seong-Mi Park (editor), Gimm-Young Publishers, Inc. (Korean only)

External links
 Official Homepage 

1954 births
Korean conductors (music)
Living people
People from Itami, Hyōgo
Toho Gakuen School of Music alumni
Zainichi Korean people
North Korean expatriates in Germany
North Korean expatriates in Japan
South Korean expatriates in Japan
21st-century conductors (music)